James Villas (previously known as James Villa Holidays) is a holiday villa company, with a head office based in Maidstone in the UK. The business operates as part of the Awaze group - A holiday rentals business. The James Villas company has over 7000 properties, which are let out to customers who wish to use them as temporary holiday homes.

History 

The founder of James Villas is James Needham, who created the company in 1984. He first thought of the idea when holidaying in Lanzarote, at which time he and his wife owned a holiday villa, and were renting it out in their absence. Following redundancy from his job at the Evening Standard, James Needham invested his time in looking for new properties to purchase, and rent out to prospective holidaymakers. For the first few years James Needham ran the business with his wife, and later employed his late son, Darren.

During the recession of the late 1990s, the company chose to purchase a chunk of the advertising space that was available at the time, which was available at a cheaper cost than before the recession. Using word of mouth and TV advertising, the company’s growth increased by 40% for a number of years.

Change of ownership 

Following his son’s death, James Needham sold the company in 2008.  Now under the management of Wyndham Vacation Rentals, James Villas continues to employ many of its original employees.

In 2014, Mark Bloxham took over the role of Managing Director, to replace Malcom Hoad, who left after two years in the position. Bloxham has been working for James Villas as Marketing Director, and oversaw both the James Villas Holidays and Villas4You brands as Managing Director.  In August 2016 Bloxham left James Villas and was replaced by Sean Lowe.  Lowe himself left James Villas in September 2017 with Alan MacLean taking the helm in October 2017.

Awards 

James Villa Holidays has won a number of awards since its inception. The awards in full are as follows:

 Winner at the British Travel Awards for Best Large Villa/Self Catering Holiday Booking Company in 2013, 2014, 2015, 2016, 2017, 2019 and won the silver three years in a row from 2010.
 Winner at The Sunday Times Travel Magazine Awards for Best Villa Company in 2010, 2011 and 2012.
 Winner of Condé Nast Traveller’s Favourite Villa Rental Company in 2012,  and won the silver for this award in 2013 and 2014.
 Runner up at The Telegraph Travel Awards for Specialist Tour Operator in 2014.

References 

Holiday villages
Travel and holiday companies of the United Kingdom